Republican Alternative Party may refer to:
 Republican Alternative Party (Azerbaijan)
 Republican Alternative Party (Spain)

See also
 Republican Party (disambiguation)